Matthew Umberto Catavolo (born February 13, 2003) is a Canadian professional soccer player who currently plays for Valour FC of the Canadian Premier League.

Early life
Catavolo began playing soccer at age three with ASTMP St-Michel. He later joined the CF Montréal Academy at age 13. In 2021, he spent much of the season training with the first team and also played with the CF Montreal U23 team, being the team's top scorer.

Club career
In February 2022, he signed his first professional contract with Valour FC of the Canadian Premier League. He made his debut in Valour's season-opener against FC Edmonton on April 10.

International career
Catavolo made his debut in the Canadian program attending a camp with the Canada U17 team in March 2019. He was subsequently named to the rosters for the 2019 CONCACAF U-17 Championship and the 2019 FIFA U-17 World Cup.

In April 2022 he received his first call up to the under-20s for a pair of friendlies against Costa Rica. In the first game on April 15, Catavolo scored his first goal for the youth teams, netting the third goal in a 3–0 victory. In June 2022, he was named to the Canadian U-20 team for the 2022 CONCACAF U-20 Championship. He scored his first goal in an official international competition on June 22 against Saint Kitts & Nevis U20.

Career statistics

References

External links

2003 births
Living people
Soccer players from Montreal
Canadian soccer players
Canada men's youth international soccer players
Canadian sportspeople of Italian descent
Association football midfielders
Valour FC players
Canadian Premier League players